Sambasiva Krishna Sarma (born 13 October 1984) is an Indian cricketer who represented Kerala in domestic cricket. He is the first Kerala player to score a century in both the innings' of a 
Ranji Trophy match.

He made his List-A debut for Kerala on 10 February 2007 in the 2006-07 Vijay Hazare Trophy against Karnataka. He made his first-class debut for Kerala on 3 November 2007 in the 2007-08 Ranji Trophy against Vidarbha.

References

Cricketers from Chennai
Living people
Indian cricketers
Kerala cricketers
1984 births